John Swail (9 December 1944 - 3 May 2013), better known under his stage name Guy Darrell, was a British singer and musician active in the 1960s and 1970s. His biggest hit, "I've Been Hurt" reached number 12 on the UK Singles Chart in 1973.

Biography
Born in Kent, he began his career in the early 1960s singing with Ray McVay's band. Two of his singles with McVay were "Daddy Cool", released in 1961, and "I’ve Been Hurt" a cover of the hit by Bill Deal And The Rondels, which was released in 1966. He also recorded "Turn To Me" and "Sing Me No Sad Songs". The latter, a composition by Elton John and Bernie Taupin, was released in 1969 and almost immediately withdrawn. He became front-man for the band Guy Darrell and the Midniters in 1964. Most of his early songs were covers of US originals, such as "Sorry" by The Impalas, "Stupidity" by Solomon Burke, and "Somewhere They Can't Find Me" by Paul Simon. None of them reached the charts, although some received radio play, especially on pirate radio stations.

In 1966, he released "I've Been Hurt" on the CBS label, a 1965 song by Ray Whitley which had already been covered with some success in the US by The Tams. Despite the involvement of Des Champ, this release also failed to reach the UK chart, although it was a top ten hit in South Africa.

During the remainder of the 1960s, Darrell continued to record for various UK record labels. He was able to record, through his connections with Roger Easterby and Des Champ, a version of Elton John's song "Skyline Pigeon" almost a year before the composer's own version was released.

In 1967, Darrell married Lyn Webster.

In 1969, he formed the band Guy Darrell Syndicate with musicians with whom he had been working at BBC radio. The band included:  Darrell on vocals; Martin Jenner, guitar and Dave Green, bass/flute (both ex-Summer Set); Derek Elson, keyboards, and Graham Jarvis on drums. Among the band's songs were "Birds Of A Feather", for which composer credit was given to Joe South, and "Keep The Rain From My Door".

After one single release "How Are You?" on Page One Records in October 1969, the Guy Darrell Syndicate morphed into Deep Feeling. At this point, Darrell abandoned the Guy Darrell stage name temporarily and reverted to his given name John Swail; press releases for Deep Feeling made no mention of his previous career as Guy Darrell. While they continued to release 45 RPM cover versions of US songs such as Bobby Freeman's "Do You Want To Dance" and a further version of "Skyline Pigeon", the group (including Swail) also began to compose in their own right. Their range of cover versions began to expand from the musical mainstream toward progressive rock.

In 1971, they released their only album, also titled Deep Feeling, once more produced by Easterby and Champ, released by DJM Records. The album moved yet further toward progressive rock, and though little noted at the time, Deep Feeling has received subsequent critical reassessment and notice, and has been re-released several times up to the present day. Also in 1971, the group composition "Sweat, Dust And Red Wine" was covered by Chicory Tip on their album Son Of My Father.

Throughout the early 1970s, Deep Feeling regularly performed live, playing a mixture of their own material and covers from progressive bands such as Yes and Led Zeppelin in east London and throughout the UK. (Deep Feeling are not to be confused with the short-lived band of the same name, of which Jim Capaldi and Luther Grosvenor were members).)

Meantime, the song "I've Been Hurt" had once more been a US hit in 1969 for Bill Deal and the Rhondels, and this version became popular in northern soul clubs such as the Twisted Wheel. Roger Easterby and Des Champ were setting up their own record label, Santa Ponsa Records, and having noted the popularity of the song, made one of the new label's first issues a re-release of Darrell's 1965 recording of it, backed with the original B-side "Blessed" written by Paul Simon. The re-release made its way into the UK Singles Chart, earning Darrell a spot on Top of the Pops  (broadcast 20 September 1973) backed by the other members of Deep Feeling. This despite the fact that none of them had played on the recording in question. The song reached a chart high of No. 12 for the week ending 29 September 1973.

Following this belated success, Darrell resumed the use of his stage name for recordings, and made several more records with Easterby and Champ for Santa Ponsa; Deep Feeling also released one final single on the same label. For these releases he relinquished progressive rock and reverted to his previous style of covering more mainstream songs. However, no further chart success was forthcoming, and Darrell's final record release came in 1975.

Guy Darrell died of cancer in Spain on 3 May 2013.

Discography

Albums
As member of Deep Feeling:
Deep Feeling (DJM DSLPS419) (November 1971)

As Guy Darrell:
I've Been Hurt (CBS 53364)
I've Been Hurt (Santa Ponsa PNL 502) (different contents from CBS album)

Singles
As Guy Darrell and the Midniters:
"Go Home Girl"/"You Won't Come Home" (Oriole CB 1932, 1964)
"Sorry"/"Sweet Dreams" (Oriole CB 1964, 1964)

As Guy Darrell and Wind of Change:
"Stupidity"/"One of These Days" (CBS 201806, 1965)

As Guy Darrell:
"Somewhere They Can't Find Me"/"It Takes a Lot to Laugh, It Takes a Train to Cry" (CBS 202033, 1966)
"I've Been Hurt"/"Blessed" (CBS 202082, 1966)
"Big Louie"/"My Way of Thinking" (CBS 202296, 1966)
"Hard Lovin'"/"I've Never Had a Love Like That" (CBS 202510, 1967)
"Crystal Ball"/"Didn't I" (CBS 202642, 1967)
"Evil Woman"/"What Do You Do About That" (Piccadilly 7N35406, 1967)
"Cupid"/"What's Happened to Our Love" (Pye 7N17435, 1967)
"Skyline Pigeon"/"Everything" (Pye 7N17586, 1968)
"Turn to Me"/"What's Her Name" (Page One POF 120, 1969)
"Birds of a Feather"/"Keep the Rain from My Door" (Page One POF 141, 1969)

As Guy Darrell Syndicate:
"How Are You?"/"The Turtle Tortoise & the Hare" (Page One POF 155, 1969)

As member of Deep Feeling:
"Do You Love Me"/"Move On" (Page One POF 165, 1970)
"Skyline Pigeon"/"We've Thrown It All Away" (Page One POFS 177, 1970)
"Do You Wanna Dance"/"The Day My Lady Cried" (DJM DJS231, 1970)
"Sweat, Dust and Red Wine"/"Turn Around" (DJM DJS237, 1971)
"Country Heir"/"We've Thrown It All Away" (DJM DJS257, 1971)
"Sunday Morning Leaving"/"Why Lady Why?" (Philips 6006 246, 1972)
"Let's Spend the Night Together"/"Avalon" (Santa Ponsa PNS 12, 1974)

As Guy Darrell:
"I've Been Hurt"/Blessed" (Santa Ponsa PNS 4, 1973) - reissue of CBS 202082
"Hard Road"/"We've Thrown It All Away" (Santa Ponsa PNS 10, 1974)
"Suzie"/"What's Her Name" (Santa Ponsa PNS 16, 1974)
"You're Ready Now"/"Turn to Me" (Santa Ponsa PNS 19, 1974)
"The Shape I'm In"/"Right Here on Earth" (Santa Ponsa PNS 24, 1974)
"Hard Lovin'"/"We've Thrown It All Away" (Route RT08, 1975)

References

External links
 Photographs by Dave Green of Deep Feeling, including several of Guy Darrell and his bandmates

1940 births
2013 deaths
English male singers
People from Kent
Northern soul musicians
Deaths from cancer in Spain
Oriole Records (UK) artists